Filiform, thread or filament like, can refer to:

Filiform, a common term used in botany to describe a thread-like shape 
Filiform, or filiform catheter, a medical device whose component parts or segments are all cylindrical and more or less uniform in size
Filiform papilla on the tongue
Insect antennae shape
Thread-like crystal formations
A corrosion mechanism